de Cantilupe (anciently Cantelow, Cantelou, Canteloupe, etc., Latinised to de Cantilupo) may refer to:

George de Cantilupe (1252–1273), Lord of Abergavenny from the Marches of South Wales under Edward I of England
Thomas de Cantilupe (1218–1282), English saint and prelate
Walter de Cantilupe (died 1266), medieval Bishop of Worcester
William I de Cantilupe (died 1239), Anglo-Norman baron and royal administrator
William II de Cantilupe (died 1251), Anglo-Norman landowner and administrator
William III de Cantilupe (died 1254), lord of Abergavenny in right of his wife, Eva de Braose

See also
Cantaloupe (disambiguation)